Körfuknattleiksfélagið Patrekur was a basketball club in Reykjavík, Iceland. They played their home games in Smárinn in Kópavogur.

Seasons

External links
 KKÍ: Patrekur - kki.is

References

Basketball teams in Iceland